Wizz Jones is the 1969 album by the pioneer British folk musician Wizz Jones. This was Jones' debut solo album, despite having been a performer since 1959.

Track listing
All songs composed by Alan Tunbridge; except where indicated

"Teapot Blues" (Wizz Jones)
"Shall I Wake You from Your Sleep?"
"A Common or Garden Mystery"
"I've Got a Woman with One Leg"  
"Shukkin' Sugar Blues" (Blind Lemon Jefferson)
"Earl's Court Breakdown" (based on "Trombone" by Chet Atkins; arranged by Wizz Jones)
"Oh My Friend"
"Blues and Trouble"
"Can't Stop Thinkin' About It" (Alan Tunbridge, Wizz Jones)  
"Dazzling Stranger"
"At the Junction"
"American Land" (Pete Seeger)
"I Wanna See the Manager"
"Corrine's Blues"
"Grapes of Life"
"Guitar Shuffle" (Lowell Fulson)

Personnel
Wizz Jones - acoustic guitar, lead vocals

Label and catalogue information
 Label: United Artists
 Cat. no: ULP 1029 (MONO), (S)ULP 1029 (STEREO)

Production
Liner Notes: Long John Baldry

References

Wizz Jones albums
1969 debut albums
United Artists Records albums